Vernon Alphonsus Reid (born 22 August 1958) is an English-born American guitarist and songwriter. Reid is the founder and primary songwriter of the rock band Living Colour, Reid was named No. 66 on Rolling Stone magazine's 2003 list of the 100 Greatest Guitarists of All Time.

Critic Steve Huey writes, "[Reid's] rampant eclecticism encompasses everything from heavy metal and punk to funk, R&B and avant-garde jazz, and his anarchic, lightning-fast solos have become something of a hallmark as well."

Early life

Born in London, England, Reid was raised in New York City. He attended Brooklyn Technical High School, then New York University.

Career

Early career
He first came to prominence in the 1980s in the band of drummer Ronald Shannon Jackson. 1984's Smash & Scatteration was a duo record with guitarist Bill Frisell. In 1985, Reid co-founded the Black Rock Coalition with journalist Greg Tate and producer Konda Mason.

Living Colour

Reid is best known for leading Living Colour. Early versions of the group formed in New York City in 1983, but the personnel solidified in 1985–86, and Reid led the group for about another decade.

Their debut album Vivid was released in 1988 and sold double Platinum. Its successor Time's Up was released 1990 and was gold-certified. They received two consecutive Grammy Awards in the category of Best Hard Rock Performance. They opened for the Rolling Stones' 1989 "Steel Wheels" tour; and appeared on the first Lollapalooza tour in the summer of 1991.

Living Colour broke up in 1995 but reformed in 2000. Since then, they have released three more albums: Collideøscope in October 2003 on Sanctuary Records, The Chair in the Doorway in September 2009, and Shade in September 2017 on Megaforce Records.

Solo career
In addition to his work with Living Colour, Reid has been engaged in a number of other projects. He released Mistaken Identity, his first solo album, in 1996, and has collaborated with the choreographers Bill T. Jones on Still/Here and Donald Byrd on Jazztrain. He performed "Party 'Til The End of Time" at the Brooklyn Academy of Music (BAM) with The Roots, an end of the 2000 millennium tribute featuring the music of Prince's album 1999. He also composed and performed "Bring Your Beats" a children's program for BAM.

Reid has also undertaken significant work as a record producer, including two Grammy-nominated albums: Papa (1999) by the African vocalist Salif Keita and Memphis Blood: The Sun Sessions (2001) by guitarist James Blood Ulmer. Ulmer's subsequent albums, No Escape from the Blues: The Electric Lady Sessions (2003), Birthright (2005), and Bad Blood in the City: The Piety Street Sessions (2007), were also produced by Reid.

Reid also appears on Guitar Oblique (Knitting Factory) with guitarists David Torn and Elliott Sharp. Reid was also featured in the program presented by BAM and the Experience Music Project in Seattle entitled "Magic Science", which includes Medeski Martin & Wood and the Gil Evans Orchestra performing Gil Evans' arrangements of songs by Jimi Hendrix.

Reid composed the score for the film Paid in Full, directed by Charles Stone III (well known for creating the "Wasssup!" series of commercials for Budweiser as well as directing three videos for Living Colour) and released by Miramax in the fall of 2002. Reid also composed the score for the celebrated documentary Ghosts of Attica (directed by Brad Lichtenstein), which aired on Court TV in the fall of 2001 and has been featured at several film festivals. He composed the score for another documentary directed by Lichtenstein, Almost Home, which aired in 2006 on the PBS series Independent Lens.

Reid and DJ Logic, calling themselves "Yohimbe Brothers", released an album in September 2002 entitled Front End Lifter. The Yohimbe Brothers have been touring on and off since the release of the album. Reid was also the music supervisor for the film Mr. 3000, starring Bernie Mac and directed by Charles Stone III; the film was released in September 2004. Vernon's album with Masque (Leon Gruenbaum – keyboards and Samchillian, Hank Schroy – bass and Marlon Browden – drums), an instrumental album entitled Known Unknown, was released in April 2004, and on 18 April 2006 Vernon Reid and Masque released Other True Self, both on Favored Nations records, owned by another guitarist, Steve Vai.

Reid has a prolific session output in a variety of contexts. He has played live or on record with The Roots, Eye & I, Mick Jagger, Ambitious Lovers, Rollins Band, Spearhead, Public Enemy, Janet Jackson, Mariah Carey, Tracy Chapman, Ronald Shannon Jackson, Don Byron, Defunkt, Santana, Bernie Worrell, MC 900 Ft. Jesus, B.B. King, Madeleine Peyroux, Meridiem, Jack Bruce, Terry Bozzio, Black Sugar Transmission (Reid solos on the title track of 2009's USE IT EP) and DJ Spooky.

Reid played at America's Millennium Gala, New Year's Eve 31 December 1999, and 1 January 2000, at the Lincoln Memorial, performing "Fortunate Son" with John Fogerty. Among those in the audience were President Bill Clinton and First Lady Hillary Clinton.

In March 2007, Reid played with Jamaaladeen Tacuma, and G. Calvin Weston at Tonic in New York and Tritone in Philadelphia, which led them to record as Free Form Funky Freqs. Their debut recording, Urban Mythology Volume One, was released in 2008.

In July 2008, Vernon Reid assembled a one-off solo band for his appearance at the G-TARanaki Guitar Festival in Taranaki, New Zealand, with keyboard player Jonathan Crayford, bassist Crete Haami and drummer Magesh Magesh. At the Puke Ariki "Midnight Session" concert, Vernon performed an all-star jam with Uli Jon Roth, Gilby Clarke and Alex Skolnick.

In 2008, Reid also played a series of Blue Note Club tribute concerts to the Tony Williams Lifetime in Japan with Jack Bruce, Cindy Blackman and John Medeski. In June 2012 the collaboration released a self-titled album Spectrum Road on the US jazz record label Palmetto. This was accompanied by a series of dates at large jazz festivals in North America and Europe throughout June and July.

In 2018, Reid signed with Mascot Label Group. He has an album slated for release in 2019.

An Underground Railroad of the Mind
In 2017, Reid debuted his semi-monthly broadcast on the streaming radio station Home. His show, titled "An Underground Railroad of the Mind", features Reid playing vinyl records from his record collection.

Personal life
Reid resides in Staten Island with his wife Gabri Christa, a choreographer and filmmaker, and their daughter Idea (born 30 June 2003).

Influences
Reid has cited Miles Davis, James Brown, Jimi Hendrix, Robert Fripp, John Coltrane, Frank Zappa, Jeff Beck, Carlos Santana, Eddie Hazel, John McLaughlin, Jimmy Page, Eddie Van Halen, and Dr. Know among his influences.

Equipment 

During the early years of Living Colour, Reid used a multi-colored ESP Mirage with EMG pickups, and he was an endorser of the A/DA MP-1 preamp. During the mid-1980s, Reid commissioned a highly figured maple custom guitar from Vancouver-based luthier Martini Guitars.  This guitar was later acquired by Bob Wiseman, a founding member of the band Blue Rodeo.  In later years, Reid has used custom Hamer guitars, and started a relationship with Parker Guitars, who built the DF824VR Vernon Reid signature model based on their Dragonfly design. it has EMG-X pickups in a H SS layout with 5-way switching system, a Floyd Rose vibrato (a first for Parker), and a Roland GK divided pickup.
In 2016, he switched to PRS and was working on a signature model with them. The result is the PRS S2 VR Vela.

ESP Released the 86-run limited edition Cult '86 based on the original used on "Cult of Personality."

Selected discography

With Living Colour

With Masque
 Mistaken Identity (Sony, 1996)
 Known Unknown (Sony, 2004)
 Other True Self (2006)

With Yohimbe Brothers
 Front End Lifter (2002)
 The Tao of Yo (2004)

Obscure and/or unreleased
 This Little Room (Sony, 2000)

In collaboration
 With Bill Frisell: Smash & Scatteration (Minor Music, 1984)
 With Elliott Sharp and David Torn: GTR OBLQ (1998)
 With Jack Bruce, John Medeski and Cindy Blackman Santana: Spectrum Road (2012)
 With Melvin Gibbs/Mary Halvorson/Lee Ranaldo/Vernon Reid/Elliott Sharp Christian Marclay: Graffiti Composition (2010; Dog w/ a Bone Records)

As sideman
With Geri Allen
The Gathering (Verve, 1998)

With Cindy Blackman
 Another Lifetime (4Q, 2010)

With Jack Bruce
More Jack than God (Sanctuary Records Group Ltd., 2003)

With Tracy Chapman
 Matters of the Heart (Elektra Records, 1992)

With Free Form Funky Freqs
Urban Mythology Volume One (2008)
Bon Vivant (2013)
Hymn of the 3rd Galaxy (Ropeadope, 2022)

With Ronald Shannon Jackson and the Decoding Society
Mandance (Antilles, 1982)
Barbeque Dog (Antilles, 1983)
Montreux Jazz Festival (Knit Classics, 1983)
Decode Yourself (Island, 1985)

With Mick Jagger
 Primitive Cool (Columbia Records, 1987)

With Garland Jeffreys
 Don't Call Me Buckwheat (RCA Records, 1991)

With K'naan
 Troubadour (A&M, 2009)

With Public Enemy
 Yo! Bum Rush the Show (Def Jam, 1987)

With DJ Spooky and Dave Lombardo
 Drums of Death (Thirsty Ear, 2005)

With Mitch Winston and the Band of Natural Selection
 Right Back (2002)

Media appearances
 Cyberpunk (1990)

References

External links
 Vernon Reid at Facebook
 Vernon Reid video interview
 Tracie Morris, Vernon Reid interview, BOMB 43/Spring 1993
Vernon Reid Interview - NAMM Oral History Library (2016)

1958 births
Living people
Ableton Live users
American rock guitarists
Alternative metal guitarists
American heavy metal guitarists
British emigrants to the United States
Lead guitarists
Living Colour members
New York University alumni
People from Staten Island
550 Music artists
Brooklyn Technical High School alumni
20th-century American guitarists
Thirsty Ear Recordings artists
Ropeadope Records artists
Knitting Factory Records artists
African-American rock musicians
21st-century African-American people
20th-century African-American musicians